"Even If" is a single from Christian rock band MercyMe from their 2017 studio album Lifer. It samples the chorus of the hymn "It Is Well with My Soul." The song was the number-one song on the Hot Christian Songs chart for three weeks.

Chart history

Weekly charts

Year-end charts

Decade-end charts

Certifications

References 

2017 singles
2017 songs
MercyMe songs
Songs written by Bart Millard
Songs written by Ben Glover
Columbia Records singles